Wim De Corte is a Belgian football manager.

His previous clubs include Standaard Wetteren, Beerschot AC and Roeselare.

References

1971 births
Living people
Belgian footballers
Beerschot A.C. managers
People from Wetteren
Association footballers not categorized by position
Belgian football managers
Sportspeople from East Flanders